The 1985 World Sambo Championships were held in San Sebastian, Spain on September 1985. Championships were organized for first time by FIAS.

Medal overview

External links 
Results on Sambo.net.ua

World Sambo Championships
1985 in sambo (martial art)
Sport in San Sebastián